The 1931–32 Bradford City A.F.C. season was the 25th in the club's history.

The club finished 7th in Division Two, and reached the 3rd round of the FA Cup.

Sources

References

Bradford City A.F.C. seasons
Bradford City